The Hôtel van Eetvelde is a town house designed in 1895 by Victor Horta for Edmond van Eetvelde, administrator of Congo Free State. It is located at 4, / in Brussels, Belgium.

Together with three other town houses of Victor Horta, including Horta's own house and workshop, it was added to the UNESCO World Heritage list in 2000, as the core of epoch-making urban residences Victor Horta designed before 1900.

Building

Main building
The visible application of "industrial" materials, such as steel and glass, was a novel for prestigious private dwellings at the time. In the Hôtel van Eetvelde, Horta also used a hanging steel construction for the facade. The interior receives additional lighting through a central reception room covered by a stained glass cupola.

Extension
An extension to the house was designed by Horta in 1898. This building has a more conventional, beautifully detailed, sandstone facade. It was designed to house a garage, an office for van Eetvelde, as well as supporting apartments, and therefore had a separate entrance at 2, /.

This house later became the home of the architect , collaborator of Horta who became, after the latter's death, the great defender of his work.

Interior design
The interior of the central building revolves around an octagonal rotunda surmounted by a skylight. This rotunda and its glass roof were reconstructed in 1988, as they were originally designed by Horta.

Horta combined here a rest area and a movement area: the rotunda has the function of a small living room or Winter Garden, but it is surrounded by a circulation area that provides the connection with the living room, the dining room and stairwell.

The cupola with its coloured stained glass windows is supported by eight steel columns which "are integrated into this vegetal world like rods". The dining room door is adorned with opalescent glass whose tint changes according to the intensity and incidence of light.

Awards
The UNESCO commission recognised the Hôtel van Eetvelde as UNESCO World Heritage in 2000, as part of the listing 'Major Town Houses of the Architect Victor Horta':

See also
 Art Nouveau in Brussels
 History of Brussels
 Belgium in "the long nineteenth century"

References

Notes

Bibliography

External links

 Hôtel van Eetvelde on greatbuildings.com

Houses in Belgium
City of Brussels
World Heritage Sites in Belgium
Victor Horta buildings
Art Nouveau architecture in Brussels
Art Nouveau houses
Houses completed in 1900